Thomas McCormack (born 11 March 1953) is a retired Irish sportsperson.  He played hurling with his local club James Stephens club and was a member of the Kilkenny senior inter-county team in the 1970s and 1980s.

References

1953 births
Living people
James Stephens hurlers
Kilkenny inter-county hurlers
All-Ireland Senior Hurling Championship winners